Dresher may refer to:

Dresher (surname)
Dresher, Pennsylvania